The Mountain Views News is a weekly newspaper for the city of Sierra Madre, California and surrounding communities.  The Mountain Views News covers the northern San Gabriel Valley including the cities of Sierra Madre, Pasadena, Altadena, South Pasadena, San Marino, Arcadia, Monrovia, and Duarte.  It is legally adjudicated for the County of Los Angeles as a paper of general circulation authorized to publish legal notices throughout Los Angeles County.  The paper is distributed via home delivery and via newsracks.

The Mountain Views News also has a website at www.mtnviewsnews.com. The paper's online presence has had more than 20 million viewers as of December 31, 2019.

History
The paper is a derivative of the Sierra Madre News which was operated for 14 years by Jan Reed. It was sold in 1997, and the new owner changed the name to Sierra Madre Mountain Views. That publication was sold again in 2004, and the name was changed to MV News Magazine. That publication was sold to Grace Lorraine Publications, Inc. in 2007. At that time, Susan Henderson, Founder and President of Grace Lorraine Publications established the Mountain Views Observer, and later changed the name to Mountain Views News.  Henderson remains the Publisher/Editor of the Mountain Views News.

The Mountain Views News newspaper is published every Saturday and the online edition is published every Sunday.

External links
 

Newspapers published in Greater Los Angeles
Sierra Madre, California
Weekly newspapers published in California